Feeling Good is an album by drummer Art Blakey and the Jazz Messengers recorded in California in 1986 and released on the Delos label.

Reception

Scott Yanow of Allmusic stated "The repertoire includes both new originals and a few Messenger standbys; the music is consistently enjoyable".

Track listing 
 "On the Ginza" (Wayne Shorter) - 8:54    
 "Feeling Good" (Kenny Garrett) - 8:16    
 "Minor's Holiday" (Kenny Dorham) - 6:45    
 "Second Thoughts" (Mulgrew Miller) - 7:43    
 "Caravan" (Duke Ellington, Irving Mills, Juan Tizol) - 13:43    
 "Crooked Smile" (Jean Toussaint) - 8:10    
 "One by One" (Shorter) - 10:10    
 "Obsession" (Wallace Roney) - 7:04

Personnel 
Art Blakey - drums
Wallace Roney - trumpet
Tim Williams - trombone
Kenny Garrett - alto saxophone
Jean Toussaint - tenor saxophone
Donald Brown - piano
Peter Washington - bass

References 

Art Blakey albums
The Jazz Messengers albums
1988 albums
Albums produced by Orrin Keepnews